Sir Sydney Russell-Wells, FRCP (25 September 1869 – 14 July 1924) was a  British physician and politician. He served as Member of Parliament for London University from 1922 until 1924, as a Unionist.

Early life
He was born in London and attended Dorset County School. He graduated from University College London with a BSc in 1889 and then studied medicine at St George's Hospital.

Career

Medicine
He was House Surgeon, House Physician and Registrar at St George's Hospital, then based at Hyde Park Corner in central London. He was then physician at the Seaman's Hospital, Greenwich and later at the National Hospital for Diseases of the Heart. He was Vice Chancellor of the University of London from 1919 to 1922.

Politics
He served as Member of Parliament for London University from 1922 until 1924, sitting as a Unionist.

Honours
In 1921, he was appointed Knight Bachelor (Kt).

See also
 List of Vice-Chancellors of the University of London
 London University (UK Parliament constituency)

References

External links 
 

1869 births
1924 deaths
Alumni of University College London
Alumni of St George's, University of London
Fellows of the Royal College of Physicians
Members of the Parliament of the United Kingdom for London University
UK MPs 1922–1923
UK MPs 1923–1924
Vice-Chancellors of the University of London
Conservative Party (UK) MPs for English constituencies
Knights Bachelor